Fairytale is the second album from British singer-songwriter Donovan. It was first released in the UK on 22 October 1965 through Pye Records (catalog number NPL 18128). The US version of Fairytale was released by Hickory Records (catalog number LPM 127 [monaural] / LPS 127 [stereo]) in November 1965 with a slightly different set of songs. Peter Eden, Geoff Stephens and Terry Kennedy produced the original album.

History
Fairytale finds Donovan evolving his styles further towards British folk, especially on songs such as "Summer Day Reflection Song" and "Jersey Thursday". "Sunny Goodge Street" foreshadows the jazzy feel and descriptions of life in urban London that Donovan would continue to explore over the next two years. Like his previous album What's Bin Did and What's Bin Hid, Fairytale primarily features Donovan singing and playing mouth harp and acoustic guitar. Shawn Phillips is playing the extra twelve-string guitar.

For release in the US, Hickory Records added a cover of Buffy Sainte-Marie's "Universal Soldier" and removed a cover of Bert Jansch's "Oh Deed I Do". Donovan's recording of "Universal Soldier" was released in the US as a single the previous September, and was achieving some chart success.

The Canadian pressing, issued on the British Pye label, omitted "Belated Forgiveness Plea" but included "Oh Deed I Do" and "Universal Soldier".

Reissues
In January 1969, Fairytale was reissued in an edited form (Marble Arch Records MAL 867) in the UK. "Colours" and "The Little Tin Soldier" were both removed from the album.
In February 1991, Castle Records reissued the UK version of Fairytale on compact disc (Castle CLACD226) in the UK.
In 1996, Sequel Records reissued the US version of Fairytale on compact disc (Sequel 1004-2). The CD features seven bonus tracks. The first bonus track is a cover of Bert Jansch's "Oh Deed I Do". On the original US version of Fairytale "Oh Deed I Do" was cut and a cover of Buffy Sainte-Marie's "Universal Soldier" was added. The next three songs ("Do You Hear Me Now", "The War Drags On" and "The Ballad of a Crystal Man") are from Donovan's 1965 EP Universal Soldier. "Turquoise" and "Hey Gyp (Dig the Slowness)" were originally released as Donovan's third UK single on 30 October 1965. The last bonus track is the single version of "Colours".
On 19 February 2002, Sanctuary Records reissued the original UK version of Fairytale on compact disc. The CD features six bonus tracks. The first four bonus tracks were originally released 15 August 1965 in the UK on Donovan's Universal Soldier EP. That EP featured a different take of "The Ballad of a Crystal Man". The last two bonus tracks are both sides of Donovan's third single "Turquoise"/"Hey Gyp (Dig the Slowness)" released 30 October 1965 in the UK.
On 22 February 2005, Silverline Records reissued the original UK version of Fairytale on DualDisc. The DualDisc has an identical track listing to the 2002 Sanctuary Records reissue.

Cover versions
American vocalist Judy Collins covered the song "Sunny Goodge Street" on her 1966 album, In My Life.
American musician Lindsey Buckingham covered the song "To Try For The Sun" on his 2006 album Under the Skin.
American jazz pianist Vince Guaraldi recorded a live version of "Sunny Goodge Street" in 1967 at the Old Town Theater in Los Gatos, California, later released on the album An Afternoon with the Vince Guaraldi Quartet (2011). (The song is mistitled "Autumn Leaves" on the release.)

Track listing

Original album (UK)
Side 1
"Colours" (Donovan Leitch) – 2:11
"To Try for the Sun" (Leitch) – 3:36
"Sunny Goodge Street" (Leitch) – 2:55
"Oh Deed I Do" (Bert Jansch) – 2:00
"Circus of Sour" (Paul Bernath) – 1:50
"The Summer Day Reflection Song" (Leitch) – 2:11

Side 2
"Candy Man" (Traditional; arranged by Leitch) – 3:25
"Jersey Thursday" (Leitch) – 2:13
"Belated Forgiveness Plea" (Leitch) – 2:54
"The Ballad of a Crystal Man" (Leitch) – 3:50
"The Little Tin Soldier" (Shawn Phillips) – 3:02
"The Ballad of Geraldine" (Leitch) – 4:38

1965 Hickory Records version (US)

Side 1
"Universal Soldier" (Buffy Sainte-Marie) – 2:16
"To Try for the Sun" (Leitch) – 3:36
"Sunny Goodge Street" (Leitch) – 2:55
"Colours" (Leitch) – 2:44
"Circus of Sour" (Bernath) – 1:50
"Summer Day Reflection Song" (Leitch) – 2:11

Side 2
"Candy Man" (traditional; arranged by Leitch) – 3:25
"Jersey Thursday" (Leitch) – 2:13
"Belated Forgiveness Plea" (Leitch) – 2:54
"The Ballad of a Crystal Man" (Leitch) – 3:50
"The Little Tin Soldier" (Phillips) – 3:02
"The Ballad of Geraldine" (Leitch) – 4:38

1996 Sequel Records version (US)
Track listing as on the 1965 Hickory Records version plus the following bonus tracks:
"Oh Deed I Do" (Jansch)  – 2:08
"Do You Hear Me Now" (Jansch)  – 1:51
"The War Drags On" (Mick Softley) – 3:44
"The Ballad of a Crystal Man" (Leitch) – 3:18
"Turquoise" (Leitch) – 3:34
"Hey Gyp (Dig the Slowness)" (Leitch) – 3:13
"Colours" (Leitch) – 2:46

2002 Sanctuary Records/Castle Records version

Track listing as on the original UK version plus the following bonus tracks:
"Universal Soldier" (Sainte-Marie)  – 2:15
"The Ballad of a Crystal Man" (Leitch)  – 3:19
"The War Drags On" (Softley)  – 3:44
"Do You Hear Me Now" (Jansch)  – 1:50
"Turquoise" (Leitch)  – 3:31
"Hey Gyp (Dig the Slowness)" (Leitch)  – 3:08

Personnel
Donovan – banjo, guitar, harmonica, vocals
Skip Alan (Alan Skipper) – drums
Brian Locking – bass guitar
Harold McNair – flute
Shawn Phillips – guitar, twelve-string guitar
Peter Eden – producer
Terry Kennedy – producer
Ren Grevatt – liner notes

References

External links
 Fairytale – Donovan Unofficial Site

1965 albums
Donovan albums
Pye Records albums
Sanctuary Records albums
Castle Communications albums
Sequel Records albums
Hickory Records albums